Basil IV Simon was the Patriarch of Antioch and head of the Syriac Orthodox Church from 1421/1422 until his death in 1444/1445.

Biography
Simon was the son of Zuwayra from the village of Beth Man‘am in Tur Abdin and was educated at the monastery of Qartmin. He had become bishop of Gargar by 1387 and was later appointed as archbishop of Jerusalem with the name Basil.

Upon the death of patriarch Philoxenus II in 1421, Simon met with the Coptic Pope Gabriel V of Alexandria to request that he be consecrated as Philoxenus' successor as patriarch of Antioch. Simon argued that Gabriel's involvement was necessary as there were too few remaining bishops of his own church and Islamic persecution prevented them from holding a synod to elect a new patriarch.

In spite of initial hesitation, Gabriel acquiesced and thus he and two Coptic bishops and one Syriac bishop consecrated Simon at Cairo at the church of Saint Mercurius and formally enthroned him at the church of the Virgin Mary in 1421 or 1422. The priest Abu l-Faraj, who would later succeed Gabriel as Pope John XI of Alexandria in 1427, also participated in Simon's consecration at the church of Saint Mercurius.

Simon later returned to Egypt in need of the chrism and so he, Pope John, and the archbishop of Jerusalem performed the ceremony to prepare the chrism together during the Holy Week of 1430 at the Hanging Church at Cairo. He served as patriarch of Antioch until his death in 1444 or 1445.

References
Notes

Citations

Bibliography

15th-century Syriac Orthodox Church bishops
14th-century births
Syriac Patriarchs of Antioch from 512 to 1783
14th-century Oriental Orthodox bishops
15th-century Oriental Orthodox archbishops
1440s deaths